Susan "Sue" Speer C.Psychol, FHEA is a senior lecturer at the School of Psychological Sciences, University of Manchester.

From 2005 to 2006 Speer was an ESRC-SSRC collaborative visiting fellow in the department of sociology at the University of California at Los Angeles (UCLA).

Selected bibliography

Forthcoming

Books

Chapters in books 
 
 
 
 
 
 
 
 
With a response by Hammersley, Martyn: 'Analytics' are no substitute for methodology: A response to Speer and Hutchby

Journal articles 
 
 
 
 
With a response: 
Rejoinder: 
 
 
With a response: 
With a response: 
With a response: 
Rejoinder: 
 
 
 
With a response: 
Rejoinder: 
 
 
 
A response to: 
 
 
 
 
A response to: 
Rejoinder: 
 
A response to:  Pdf of pp. 615–646.

References

External links 
 Susan Speer: profile page, Manchester University

Academics of Loughborough University
British psychologists
British sociologists
Place of birth missing (living people)
University of California, Los Angeles faculty
Year of birth missing (living people)
Living people
Alumni of Loughborough University
Fellows of the Higher Education Academy